K. M. Cherian may refer to:

 K. M. Cherian (doctor), Indian heart surgeon
 K. M. Cherian (journalist) (1897–1973), Indian journalist